Rabbit's Back, also called Rabbit Back, is an elevated promontory, or peninsula, that extends eastward into Lake Huron.

The promontory separates two shallow bays of the extreme northwestern coast of Lake Huron, Evergreen Shores to the south and Horseshoe Bay to the north. From nearby Mackinac Island the promontory is said to appear like the back of a crouching rabbit, hence the name Rabbit's Back. Like nearby Castle Rock, the promontory is a somewhat erosion-resistant mass of brecciated Straits of Mackinac limestone.

The promontory is located within Hiawatha National Forest.

See also
 Castle Rock (Michigan)
 Straits of Mackinac
 Mackinac Island

References

Geology of Michigan
Landforms of Mackinac County, Michigan
Peninsulas of Michigan